Huron Consulting Group, commonly known as Huron, is a management consulting firm offering  services to the Healthcare, Life Sciences, Commercial, and Higher Education industries.

History 
Huron (etymologically from Lake Huron) was founded in May 2002 in Chicago, Illinois. As of 2019, Huron had more than 3,700 employees.

In May 2004, Huron filed a registration statement with the Securities and Exchange Commission (SEC) relating to the initial public offering of its common stock. Huron Consulting Group Inc., the holding company, became a public company trading common stock on the NASDAQ Global Select Market exchange under the ticker "HURN" in October 2004.

The firm’s headquarters are in Chicago and it has 25 global locations across North America, Europe and Asia Pacific. In fiscal year ending December 31, 2019, Huron generated $876.8 million in annual revenue.

Recent acquisitions

AIMDATA  
On January 18, 2022, Huron acquired AIMDATA, LLC, a enterprise information data consulting firm who specialize in Boomi.

Pope Woodhead & Associates 
On January 9, 2017, Huron acquired Pope Woodhead & Associates, a UK-based life sciences firm.

HSM 
On July 27, 2016, Huron acquired Healthcare Services Management, Inc. (HSM), a healthcare information technology consultant.

ADI Strategies 
On May 20, 2016, Huron acquired ADI Strategies, Inc., an enterprise performance management and business intelligence firm.

MyRounding 
On February 2, 2016 Huron acquired MyRounding, a firm specializing in digital health products.

Cloud62 
On October 1, 2015 Huron acquired Cloud62, a firm specializing in complex Salesforce.com implementations and related cloud-based applications

Rittman Mead India 
On July 1, 2015, Huron acquired the India affiliate of Rittman Mead Consulting Ltd., Rittman Mead India, a data and analytics consulting firm that specializes in the implementation of enterprise performance management and analytics systems.

Studer Group 
On Feb. 13, 2015, Huron acquired Studer Group, a professional services firm that consults with healthcare providers on clinical outcomes and financial results.

Sky Analytics 
On Jan. 8, 2015, Huron acquired Sky Analytics, a Massachusetts-based provider of legal software for corporate law departments.

Threshold Consulting, Inc. 
On Oct. 2, 2014, Huron acquired Threshold Consulting, Inc., a consulting firm that provides customer relationship management consulting, cloud-based software as a service applications, business intelligence tools and data warehousing.

Vonlay LLC 
On May 5, 2014 Huron acquired Vonlay, LLC, a healthcare technology consulting firm.

Frankel Group 
On January 7, 2014 Huron acquired The Frankel Group Associates LLC, a life sciences consulting firm.

Blue Stone International 
On September 20, 2013, Huron acquired Blue Stone International, LLC, a provider of Oracle Corporation professional services. Under the terms of the agreement, Huron will acquire the assets of Blue Stone for $30 million in cash.

Click Commerce 
Huron acquired Click Commerce, a supplier of software-based applications and professional services to academic medical centers and research institutions. Terms of the acquisition were not disclosed.

Revenue

Financial restatement 
On July 31, 2009, Huron announced that the company would restate its financial statements for 2006, 2007, 2008, and first quarter 2009. That same day, Huron announced the resignation of its chairman of the board and CEO Gary Holdren, CFO Gary Burge, and that Chief Accounting Officer Wayne Lipski would soon be departing. The company also announced that James H. Roth, a founder of the company, would be Huron's new CEO. The following business day - August 3, 2009 - Huron's shares dropped 69 percent to $13.69. The company had reported that shareholders of four Huron business acquisitions, acquired between 2005 and 2007, conditionally redistributed portions of their initial and future acquisition-related payments among themselves and to certain Huron employees without Huron's knowledge or permission.  The issue was initially identified by the Chief Accounting Officer/Controller, Wayne Lipski.

On July 19, 2012, Huron announced it had reached a final settlement with the U.S. Securities and Exchange Commission (SEC) resolving the previously disclosed SEC investigation into the Company's August 2009 restatement of its financial statements for the years ended 2006, 2007 and 2008 and the first quarter of 2009. The Company agreed to the settlement without admitting or denying the SEC's findings.

References 

Companies based in Chicago
International management consulting firms
Consulting firms established in 2002
Management consulting firms of the United States
American companies established in 2002
2002 establishments in Illinois